Live at 3Arena is the sixth live album by English-Irish country singer Nathan Carter. It was released in Ireland on 17 November 2017 by Sharpe Music. The peaked at number 26 on the Irish Albums Chart.

Background
The album was recorded at the 3Arena in Dublin, Ireland on 1 April 2017. A DVD was released on 20 October 2017 and includes 20 live tracks, Bonus songs and exclusive behind the scenes film of the gig, with the album released on 17 November 2017.

Track listing

Charts

Release history

References

2017 live albums
Nathan Carter albums